Gary Young (born May 3, 1953) is an American musician and music producer best known as the original drummer of the indie rock band Pavement from its inception in 1989 until his departure in 1993.

Early life
Gary Young was born in Mamaroneck, New York. His father, Bob Young, was an engineer in the plastics business with deep knowledge of carbon fiber. He worked with Ned Steinberger in the development of the construction of his electric bass for the Steinberger company.

Career

Early career: 1984–1989 
In the 1980s, Young booked musical acts to play around Stockton, including Dead Kennedys, Circle Jerks and Black Flag. Early in the decade, he played in the punk band The Fall of Christianity with Brian Thalken of The Authorities.

Pavement: 1989–1993; 2010 
Stephen Malkmus and Scott Kannberg formed Pavement in Stockton, CA in 1989. Their first EP, Slay Tracks (1933-1969), was recorded at Young's Louder Than You Think Studio with Young contributing drums. Young would also appear on their next two EPs, Demolition Plot J-7, and Perfect Sound Forever, released in 1990 and 1991, respectively, as well as their 1992 debut album, Slanted and Enchanted. Young began gaining the band a degree of notoriety with his on- and offstage antics. He was noted for greeting the audience at the door, giving out cabbage, mashed potatoes, or cinnamon toast to fans, and for doing headstands.

His last release as a member of the group was the EP Watery, Domestic. He later appeared on two tracks on the Major Leagues EP as a producer.

He was fired from Pavement in 1993 due to conflicts with Malkmus and the rest of the band. He reunited with the band to play two shows in 2010.

Later career: 1993–present 
After leaving Pavement, he released three albums, Hospital, Things We Do for You, and The Grey Album under the name Gary Young's Hospital. The music video for the song "Plant Man" was featured in the Beavis and Butthead Season 5 episode "Skin Trade." In 2016, he collaborated with recording engineer Richard Selleseth on the album Malfunction.

He also developed and patented the Universal Shock Mount used for microphones. Making them each individually himself, he has sold over 13,000 units to distributors and online. 

He was ranked #42 of the 50 Greatest Rock Drummers by Stylus Magazine.

Personal life  
Young struggled with alcohol which often affected his live performances and behavior during his tenure with Pavement. He became sober in 1998.

Discography

With Pavement

Studio albums 
 Slanted and Enchanted (1992)

EPs 

 Slay Tracks: 1933–1969 (1989)
 Demolition Plot J-7 (1990)

 Perfect Sound Forever (1991)

 Watery, Domestic (1992)

With Gary Young's Hospital 
 Hospital (1994)
 Things We Do for You (1999)
 The Grey Album (2004)

Solo albums 
 Malfunction (2016)

References

1953 births
People from Mamaroneck, New York
Musicians from Stockton, California
Living people
Musicians from New York (state)
20th-century American drummers
American male drummers
Pavement (band) members
20th-century American male musicians